33 is the common name given to the debut release from Canadian space rock band Southpacific, self-released on August 15, 1998, and later re-released as a promo on Turnbuckle Records and re-pressed in 2000.  It was produced by the band's own member, Graeme Fleming.

"33" is a reference to the total time of the record in minutes, as well as to the revolutions per minute at which a full-length vinyl record spins. (However, 33 was not released on vinyl, only on CD.)

Track listing

References

Southpacific albums
1998 EPs